The 1971 PGA Championship was the 53rd PGA Championship, played February 25–28 at the original PGA National Golf Club, presently known as BallenIsles Country Club (East Course) in Palm Beach Gardens, Florida.

Jack Nicklaus won the second of his five PGA Championships, two strokes ahead of Billy Casper, the reigning Masters champion. Nicklaus led wire-to-wire, and held a four-stroke lead over Gary Player after 54 holes, with Casper seven shots back. The two were pre-tournament favorites, along with Arnold Palmer, who shot an opening round 75 and finished at 289 (+1), eight strokes back.

Nicklaus became the first in history to complete the modern career Grand Slam for a second time; two victories in each of the four major championships. He completed his third career grand slam at the 1978 Open Championship.

The championship was played in February rather than August, due to anticipated oppressive summer weather in Florida.  The rescheduling changed the PGA Championship from the fourth and final major of the calendar year to the first in 1971, and the 1970 and 1971 editions were consecutive majors. It returned to August in 1972 at Oakland Hills in Michigan.

Past champions in the field

Made the cut

Missed the cut

Source:

Round summaries

First round
Thursday, February 25, 1971

Source:

Second round
Friday, February 26, 1971

Source:

Third round
Saturday, February 27, 1971

Source:

Final leaderboard
Sunday, February 28, 1971

Source:

References

External links
PGA Media Guide 2012
PGA Championship: history
PGA.com – 1971 PGA Championship

PGA Championship
Golf in Florida
Sports competitions in Florida
Sports in Palm Beach County, Florida
PGA Championship
PGA Championship
PGA Championship
PGA Championship